The risk-free rate of return, usually shortened to the risk-free rate, is the rate of return of a hypothetical investment with scheduled payments over a fixed period of time that is assumed to meet all payment obligations.

Since the risk-free rate can be obtained with no risk, any other investment having some risk will have to have a higher rate of return in order to induce any investors to hold it.

In practice, to infer the risk-free interest rate in a particular currency, market participants often choose the yield to maturity on a risk-free bond issued by a government of the same currency whose risks of default are so low as to be negligible. For example, the rate of return on T-bills is sometimes seen as the risk-free rate of return in US dollars.

Theoretical measurement
As stated by Malcolm Kemp in chapter five of his book Market Consistency: Model Calibration in Imperfect Markets, the risk-free rate means different things to different people and there is no consensus on how to go about a direct measurement of it.

One interpretation of the theoretical risk-free rate is aligned to Irving Fisher's concept of inflationary expectations, described in his treatise The Theory of Interest (1930), which is based on the theoretical costs and benefits of holding currency. In Fisher's model, these are described by two potentially offsetting movements:

 Expected increases in the money supply should result in investors preferring current consumption to future income.
 Expected increases in productivity should result in investors preferring future income to current consumption.

The correct interpretation is that the risk-free rate could be either positive or negative and in practice the sign of the expected risk-free rate is an institutional convention – this is analogous to the argument that Tobin makes on page 17 of his book Money, Credit and Capital. In a system with endogenous money creation and where production decisions and outcomes are decentralized and potentially intractable to forecasting, this analysis provides support to the concept that the risk-free rate may not be directly observable.

However, it is commonly observed that for people applying this interpretation, the value of supplying currency is normally perceived as being positive. It is not clear what is the true basis for this perception, but it may be related to the practical necessity of some form of (credit?) currency to support the specialization of labour, the perceived benefits of which were detailed by Adam Smith in The Wealth of Nations. However, Smith did not provide an 'upper limit' to the desirable level of the specialization of labour and did not fully address issues of how this should be organised at the national or international level.

An alternative (less well developed) interpretation is that the risk-free rate represents the time preference of a representative worker for a representative basket of consumption. Again, there are reasons to believe that in this situation the risk-free rate may not be directly observable.

A third (also less well developed) interpretation is that instead of maintaining pace with purchasing power, a representative investor may require a risk free investment to keep pace with wages.

Given the theoretical 'fog' around this issue, in practice most industry practitioners rely on some form of proxy for the risk-free rate, or use other forms of benchmark rate which are presupposed to incorporate the risk-free rate plus some risk of default. However, there are also issues with this approach, which are discussed in the next section.

Further discussions on the concept of a 'stochastic discount rate' are available in The Econometrics of Financial Markets by Campbell, Lo and MacKinley.

Proxies for the risk-free rate

The return on domestically held short-dated government bonds is normally perceived as a good proxy for the risk-free rate. In business valuation the long-term yield on the US Treasury coupon bonds is generally accepted as the risk-free rate of return. However, theoretically this is only correct if there is no perceived risk of default associated with the bond. Government bonds are conventionally considered to be relatively risk-free to a domestic holder of a government bond, because there is by definition no risk of default – the bond is a form of government obligation which is being discharged through the payment of another form of government obligation (i.e. the domestic currency). In fact, default on government debt does happen, so if in theory this is impossible, then this points out a deficiency of the theory. Another issue with this approach is that with coupon-bearing bonds, the investor does not know ex-ante what his return will be on the reinvested coupons (and hence the return cannot really be considered risk-free).

Some academics support the use of swap rates as a measurement of the risk-free rate.  state: "…the riskless rate is better proxied by the swap rate than the Treasury rate for all maturities".

There is also the risk of the government 'printing more money' to meet the obligation, thus paying back in lesser valued currency. This may be perceived as a form of tax, rather than a form of default, a concept similar to that of seigniorage. But the result to the investor is the same, loss of value according to his measurement, so focusing strictly on default does not include all risk.

The same consideration does not necessarily apply to a foreign holder of a government bond, since a foreign holder also requires compensation for potential foreign exchange movements in addition to the compensation required by a domestic holder. Since the risk-free rate should theoretically exclude any risk, default or otherwise, this implies that the yields on foreign owned government debt cannot be used as the basis for calculating the risk-free rate.

Since the required return on government bonds for domestic and foreign holders cannot be distinguished in an international market for government debt, this may mean that yields on government debt are not a good proxy for the risk-free rate.

Another possibility used to estimate the risk-free rate is the inter-bank lending rate. This appears to be premised on the basis that these institutions benefit from an implicit guarantee, underpinned by the role of the monetary authorities as 'the lendor of last resort.' (In a system with an endogenous money supply the 'monetary authorities' may be private agents as well as the central bank – refer to Graziani 'The Theory of Monetary Production'.) Again, the same observation applies to banks as a proxy for the risk-free rate – if there is any perceived risk of default implicit in the interbank lending rate, it is not appropriate to use this rate as a proxy for the risk-free rate.

Similar conclusions can be drawn from other potential benchmark rates, including AAA-rated corporate bonds of institutions deemed 'too big to fail.'

One solution that has been proposed for solving the issue of not having a good 'proxy' for the risk-free asset, to provide an 'observable' risk-free rate is to have some form of international guaranteed asset which would provide a guaranteed return over an indefinite time period (possibly even into perpetuity). There are some assets in existence which might replicate some of the hypothetical properties of this asset. For example, one potential candidate is the 'consol' bonds which were issued by the British government in the 18th century.

Application
The risk-free interest rate is highly significant in the context of the general application of capital asset pricing model which is based on the modern portfolio theory. There are numerous issues with this model, the most basic of which is the reduction of the description of utility of stock holding to the expected mean and variance of the returns of the portfolio. In reality, there may be other utility of stock holding, as described by Robert J. Shiller in his article 'Stock Prices and Social Dynamics'.

The risk-free rate is also a required input in financial calculations, such as the Black–Scholes formula for pricing stock options and the Sharpe ratio. Note that some finance and economic theories assume that market participants can borrow at the risk-free rate; in practice, very few (if any) borrowers have access to finance at the risk free rate.

The risk-free rate of return is the key input into cost of capital calculations such as those performed using the capital asset pricing model. The cost of capital at risk then is the sum of the risk-free rate of return and certain risk premia.

See also
 Short-rate model
 Capital asset pricing model
 Beta (finance)

References

Interest rates
Financial risk